Anthony Simmons (16 December 1922 – 22 January 2016) was a British writer and film director. He was associated with, though separate from, the Free Cinema movement; he said he was greatly influenced by Humphrey Jennings and by Michelangelo Antonioni’s movie Il Grido (1957).

Early life
Simmons was born in West Ham, east London, the fourth of five children – three boys and two girls – to parents of Polish extraction, Miriam (née Corb) and Joseph Simmons (originally Anzulowsky), from a family of market traders. He was named Isidore but adopted the forename Anthony in his teens. After attending West Ham Grammar School, Simmons gained a law degree from the London School of Economics, where his course was interrupted by wartime service.

Career
Simmons asserted: "I wasn’t aiming to be a film director. I was a lawyer aiming to be a writer. But I felt that if I wrote films it was more immediate. It’s quicker. You haven’t got to spell out the words, you just make the image and tell the story."

His documentary Sunday by the Sea (1951) won the Grand Prix at the Venice Film Festival. Four in the Morning (1965), his second feature film as director, did not gain a circuit release although it won awards at several international film festivals, and a BAFTA for Judi Dench as the 'Most Promising Newcomer to Leading Film Roles'.

For several years Simmons worked in radio and made television commercials until his next feature The Optimists of Nine Elms (1973) starring Peter Sellers. His feature movie Black Joy (1977) was entered into the Cannes Film Festival. His television drama On Giant's Shoulders (1979) about Terry Wiles won an Emmy Award.

He also directed episodes of British television series including The Professionals, Supergran, Inspector Morse, Van Der Valk, A Touch of Frost and C.A.T.S. Eyes.

Personal life
Simmons married twice. With his first wife, Sheila Phillips, he had three sons, Jonathan, Daniel and Mathew; the couple divorced. He is survived by his second wife, Maria St Clare, whom he married in 1981, and their three sons, Luke, Noah and Micah.

Filmography

Sunday by the Sea – documentary short – director/writer (1951)
Bow Bells – documentary short – director/writer (1953)
Passing Stranger – feature – co-writer (1954)
Time Without Pity – feature – producer (1957)
Your Money or Your Wife – feature – director (1960)
Four in the Morning – feature – director/writer (1965)
The Optimists of Nine Elms – feature – director/co-writer (1973), based on his novel The Optimists of Nine Elms
Black Joy – feature – director/co-writer (1977)
Green Ice – feature – co-writer (1981)
Little Sweetheart – feature – director/writer (1989)

Books written

References

External links
 
 Filmography on britfilms.com

 Obituary - BFI
 Obituary - The Guardian

1922 births
2016 deaths
20th-century English novelists
People from West Ham
Writers from London
Film directors from London
English male novelists
English people of Polish descent
Alumni of the London School of Economics
20th-century English male writers